Business Intelligence Development Studio (BIDS) is the former IDE from Microsoft, and was used to develop data analysis and business intelligence solutions utilizing Microsoft SQL Server Analysis Services, Reporting Services and Integration Services. It is based on the Microsoft Visual Studio development environment, but customized with the SQL Server services-specific extensions and project types, including tools, controls and projects for reports, ETL dataflows, OLAP cubes and data mining structure.

BIDS functionality can be augmented with BI Developer Extensions (previously known as BIDS Helper), a Visual Studio add-in with features that extended and enhance business intelligence development functionality in SQL Server 2005, 2008, and 2008 R2 BI Development Studio (BIDS) and SQL Server 2012 SQL Server Data Tools (SSDT). Business Intelligence Development Studio is hosted on Microsoft's project hosting website GitHub. 

Business Intelligence Markup Language (Biml) can be used in BIDS to create end-to-end BI solutions by translating Biml metadata into SQL Server Integration Services (SSIS) and SQL Server Analysis Services (SSAS) assets for the Microsoft SQL Server platform.

BIDS is not supported with Visual Studio 2010 and later, and has been replaced by SQL Server Data Tools - Business Intelligence.

References

External links
 SQL Server Data Tools
 Introducing Business Intelligence Development Studio
 BIDS Helper - Microsoft Visual Studio and SQL Server extension
 bimlscript.com - Biml online community

Microsoft database software
Microsoft development tools
Microsoft Visual Studio